Suburban Express was a bus service that provided transport services to students at six universities in the American Midwest, primarily to and from the Chicago area. Airport shuttles were operated under the name "Illini Shuttle". The company contracted buses from other carriers, and was based in Champaign, Illinois.

In the 1980s, Suburban Express broke the bus monopoly that Greyhound had between Champaign and Chicago, leading to a price war that cut student fares by more than half.

Since 1994, it filed at least 200 lawsuits over dishonored payments, fraud, and alleged violations of its terms of service, leading students to criticize the bus service online.

Suburban Express ceased operations on May 7, 2019.

History
Suburban Express began operating in late 1983. At that time, scheduled bus service between Champaign and the Chicago area in Illinois was a monopoly operated by Greyhound Lines, and reinforced by exclusive ticket sales through the University of Illinois at Urbana–Champaign (UIUC). Between November and December 1983, Greyhound Lines suffered a nationwide strike by its drivers. For the Thanksgiving break during the Greyhound strike, Dennis Toeppen, then a 19-year-old student at UIUC, and later Suburban Express' founder, chartered six buses, sold tickets through a local travel agent, spent $600 on advertising, and undercut Greyhound's fares by $4 to $8. The Thanksgiving 1983 service carried nearly 300 students.

In January 1984, and then named Western Trails Transportation, the company announced regular weekly and holiday service. UIUC's travel center, saying it relied on commissions from Greyhound and feared losing revenues, initially refused to sell competing tickets, despite their lower price. The travel center also briefly offered its own competing charter service.

In 1984, a fare war between the company and Greyhound cut prices between Champaign and Chicago by more than fifty percent. Reacting to new competition, Greyhound lowered its prices from around $36 to $14.75 and filed two complaints with the Illinois Commerce Commission. In February 1985, the company, by then called Suburban Express, charged Greyhound with predatory pricing, claiming the $14.75 price was below Greyhound's costs and designed to drive competitors out of business. According to Suburban Express' lawyer, after the Department of Justice sent a letter to Greyhound, the bus service raised their rate by $3.

Suburban Express expanded its service to Eastern Illinois University in 1985, and to Illinois State University in 1989. In 2002, the company introduced self-service ticket kiosks in the Champaign area. The company's Illini Shuttle began service connecting UIUC to Chicago's Midway and O'Hare airports in October 2004. Service to the University of Iowa began during the 2006–2007 academic year.

The company closed its office on the University of Illinois campus during 2018. The company's website stated that the campus office was closed due to nearby demolition and construction and listed current telephone hours.

Suburban Express shut down on May 7, 2019, just over a year after Illinois Attorney General filed a civil lawsuit against the company, and a month after company reached a settlement with the Attorney General.

Transportation services 
As of September 2015, Suburban Express offered weekly service to Chicago-area locations from four universities: the University of Illinois at Urbana-Champaign, Illinois State University, Purdue University, and the University of Iowa. The company's Illini Shuttle ran daily from Champaign to O'Hare International Airport and the suburbs. According to the company, it hired only non-smoking drivers, had free Wi-Fi on most buses, and in the year prior to April 2013, carried around 100,000 passengers on up to 75 buses a day.

Business practices, lawsuits, and controversies 

Suburban Express' business, legal, and media practices have been the topic of numerous media discussions since early 2013. At that time, the company's terms of service said passengers would be charged a $100 convenience fee for using an "invalid, altered or duplicate ticket" and $500 for "disruptive behavior". In April 2013, the company sought $500 payment from a passenger whom they alleged engaged in disruptive behavior on a bus, leading to an active social media discussion. The passenger was upset by the driver's words and actions, and an account of the situation was widely seen on Facebook and in a college newspaper.

The case led to discussion online, a threat by the company to sue the subreddit's moderator over false and libelous comments, a  Freedom of Information Act request by the company to UIUC, and a page on the company's website directed at the complaining passenger.

Suburban Express also maintains a "page of shame" where the company posted the name, email, phone number, and address of customers, many of them University of Illinois students, whom the company claims have "dishonored payments" or are "fare cheaters".

Suburban Express initiated 209 lawsuits between April 1994 and April 2013, of which most were small claims cases alleging terms of service violations by customers, while four were against competitors. A group of 126 lawsuits were filed in Ford County, Illinois in early 2013. Students complained that the company's choice of Ford County (30 miles from UIUC), made them ineligible for free legal aid from UIUC. In explaining its small claims actions, Suburban Express stated that some students broke the company's rules by "printing out multiple copies of the tickets and allowing others to use them," or "using tickets on the incorrect dates, or altering the dates listed on the printed copy." 
Some students asked why Suburban Express chose not to refuse invalid tickets during boarding. Suburban Express said processing during loading would be "too slow." After a backlash from UIUC students, 116 of the suits were withdrawn from Ford County, and later, 20 suits were changed to permit refiling in another venue. Suburban Express indicated it would switch its litigation to Champaign County, so that students would have access to free UIUC legal aid. The company also eliminated convenience fees from the terms of service in response to complaints.

In December 2017, Suburban Express sent an email promoting the benefits of riding, including: "you won’t feel like you’re in China when you’re on our buses." This drew criticism for what many perceived as an anti-Chinese bias. The situation was enflamed when the company sent an apology email which criticized the University of Illinois for enrolling a large number of Chinese students and "selling our university to the highest foreign bidder."

The company had a history of controversy surrounding its interactions with students dating back to 2013.

Lawsuit against Suburban Express by Illinois Attorney General 

On April 23, 2018 Illinois Attorney General Lisa Madigan filed a lawsuit against Suburban Express in the United States District Court for the Northern District of Illinois citing violations of the Civil Rights Act of 1964, right to privacy and illegal contract terms. 

Suburban Express posted a response to the lawsuit on its Facebook page, stating that it does not discriminate against any protected class, that it has used "Go Home" on English-language posters since 1985, and that it does not post customer credit card numbers online. The company denied that it harasses customers, but said that it defends itself against harassers.

On April 28, 2018, Suburban Express consented to operate under an agreed order. The agreed order called for Suburban Express to take down any personally identifying information from their website and lawsuits, notify customers whose information had been made public, stop penalizing customers who left negative reviews, and remove language from its terms and conditions that threatened to ban customers for online disparagement. The agreed order was extended twice, through July 20, 2018, when AG Madigan asked for it to be turned into a preliminary injunction, although there is no evidence that it ever was.

Settlement assistance counsel was appointed to Suburban Express in October 2018. Additionally, the company sought and was granted legal defense from its insurance carrier, Hartford Insurance. Hartford rejected company's insurance claim and sought a court judgment to not pay the costs of their legal defense.

On April 1, 2019, Suburban Express and new Illinois Attorney General Kwame Raoul reached a settlement in the form of a three-year consent decree, which was approved in court on April 9, 2019. Defendants did not admit liability but would pay the state's Consumer Trust Account $100,000, agreed to a no-retaliation clause, agreed to not disclose customer personal identifiable information, agreed to not discriminate, to post a no-discrimination notice on buses and in all advertisements, to provide anti-discrimination training, and to retain and report complaints and disclose contracts with passengers.

A week later, the Attorney General's office claimed Suburban Express was already breaking the consent decree, and filed a motion seeking $10,000 per defendant. The Attorney General's motion was denied.

On May 7, 2019, Suburban Express announced that it would be terminating all operations. "I've been tired of this business since about 2001," said the owner. As of 2023, the website remains fully active, including the personally identifying information required to be removed under the consent decree, which had continued to been updated up to before the service's closure.

References

External links

 Suburban Express
 Illini Shuttle

Intercity bus companies of the United States
Companies based in Champaign County, Illinois
Champaign, Illinois
Transport companies established in 1983
Transport companies disestablished in 2019
1983 establishments in Illinois
Transportation companies based in Illinois